Maximillian Kolenda Pacioretty (born November 20, 1988) is an American professional ice hockey left winger for the Carolina Hurricanes of the National Hockey League (NHL).

Pacioretty was drafted in the first round, 22nd overall, in the 2007 NHL Entry Draft by the Montreal Canadiens; he would go on to captain them for his last three seasons with Montreal and score 30 or more goals in five of the seasons with Montreal. He was traded to the Vegas Golden Knights before the 2018–19 NHL season; although the move revitalized his career, he was dealt to the Hurricanes four seasons later due to the Golden Knights' salary cap complications.

Playing career

Amateur

As a youth, Pacioretty played in the 2002 Quebec International Pee-Wee Hockey Tournament with the New York Rangers minor ice hockey team.

Pacioretty played high school hockey at New Canaan High School in which he led the state in points during his freshman year, and then moved on to The Taft School in Watertown, Connecticut. Pacioretty then played junior hockey for the Sioux City Musketeers of the United States Hockey League (USHL) for one season in 2006–07. Following the campaign, Pacioretty was selected in the first round, 22nd overall by the Montreal Canadiens during the 2007 NHL Entry Draft; the pick had been previously acquired by the Canadiens in a trade with the San Jose Sharks. He spent the 2007–08 season with the University of Michigan, recording 15 goals and 38 points in 36 games.

On July 17, 2008, Pacioretty signed a three-year, entry level contract with the Canadiens.

Professional

Montreal Canadiens
Pacioretty made his NHL debut with the Canadiens on January 2, 2009, scoring his first NHL goal on his first NHL shot in a 4–1 loss against the New Jersey Devils. Upon his debut, he also became the first player in Montreal's lengthy franchise history to wear jersey number 67. After starting the 2010–11 season playing for the Hamilton Bulldogs of the American Hockey League (AHL), the Canadiens' top minor league affiliate, Pacioretty was recalled for the second time to the NHL on December 12, 2010.

On March 8, 2011, Pacioretty suffered an injury following a hit by Boston Bruins defenseman Zdeno Chára. The force and location of the hit resulted in Pacioretty colliding with the stanchion at the end of the bench. He was taken off the ice on a stretcher after lying motionless on the ice for several minutes. The extent of the injury was revealed the next day to be a fracture to the 4th cervical vertebra (C4) and a severe concussion. One Bruin, Mark Recchi, questioned the severity of the concussion during an interview stating that Pacioretty was at a movie theater four days after the incident. For delivering the hit, Chára received a five-minute major penalty and a game misconduct, and after reviewing videotape of the play the NHL decided no further punishment was warranted. However, a criminal investigation was announced by the Montreal Police Service. Additionally, Air Canada threatened to remove its League sponsorship if the NHL did not take any action to prevent further violence on ice. Pacioretty recovered in time to start the 2011–12 season with the Canadiens.

For Pacioretty's part, he could not remember the incident, but after seeing the tape said that he was "disgusted" that there was no fine or suspension. About two months later, he said that he thought Chára regretted his actions and that he forgave him.

Returning to action during the 2011–12 season, Pacioretty would end the year as the team's points leader, finishing with a career-high 33 goals and 32 assists in 79 games, also winning the Bill Masterton Memorial Trophy for "perseverance, sportsmanship and dedication to hockey." He recorded his first career hat-trick on February 9, 2012, against the New York Islanders.

On August 12, 2012, Pacioretty signed a six-year, $27 million contract extension with the Canadiens. In September 2012, as a result of the impending labor lockout, he signed a contract to play overseas with Swiss National League A team HC Ambrì-Piotta.

On February 6, 2014, Pacioretty became the first Canadien to have two penalty shots awarded in the same game, against the Vancouver Canucks and goaltender Roberto Luongo, also becoming just the second player in NHL history to be awarded two penalty shots in the same period. These were his second and third NHL career penalty shots, the first occurring earlier in the season on October 12, 2013, coincidentally also against the Canucks and Luongo. Pacioretty missed all three penalty shots, but nonetheless still scored a hat trick in the February 6 game.

On September 15, 2014, Pacioretty was named an alternate captain of the Canadiens along with P. K. Subban, Tomáš Plekanec and Andrei Markov.

On September 18, 2015, Pacioretty was voted by the team to become the 29th captain in Canadiens history after going without a captain in the 2014–15 season with the departure of Brian Gionta.

The 2017–18 season was disappointing for the Canadiens, who finished 28th overall in the NHL standings. After four-straight 60+ point seasons, Pacioretty recorded only 37 total points over the season. On March 2, 2018, Pacioretty left a game against the New York Islanders due to an injury, and a few days later it was announced that Pacioretty suffered a knee injury and was set to be out for four to six weeks.

The summer prior to his contract ending, there was speculation the Canadiens were intending to trade Pacioretty. There was a trade in place to send Pacioretty to the Los Angeles Kings during the 2018 NHL Entry Draft, but Pacioretty rejected the trade. He subsequently switched agents. Pacioretty confirmed in late August that he hadn't engaged in extensions talks with the club, signaling that the final year of his contract could also be the final year of his tenure with the Canadiens.

Vegas Golden Knights
On September 10, 2018, Pacioretty was traded to the Vegas Golden Knights in exchange for Tomáš Tatar, Nick Suzuki, and a 2019 second round draft pick. He subsequently signed a four-year, $28 million contract extension with the Golden Knights.

Pacioretty made his return to Montreal on November 10, 2018. Prior to the game, the Canadiens aired a video tribute for him, while he received a standing ovation from the fans. Pacioretty recorded nine shots in a 5–4 loss. He would finish the season with 22 goals and 18 assists, and add another five goals and six assists during the Golden Knights' seven-game opening round loss to the San Jose Sharks in the 2019 Stanley Cup playoffs.

Over the course of four seasons with the Golden Knights, Pacioretty scored 97 goals, forming a key part of the team's offense. In the 2021–22 season he was hampered with a broken wrist and foot, playing only 39 games.

Carolina Hurricanes
On July 13, 2022, Pacioretty and Dylan Coghlan were traded to the Carolina Hurricanes for future considerations.

Just weeks into his tenure with Carolina, Pacioretty suffered a torn Achilles tendon during an offseason workout, necessitating surgery, and ruling him out for the first several months of the 2022–23 season. He made his Hurricanes on-ice debut on January 5, 2023 in a 5-3 loss to the Nashville Predators and scored two goals in his second game on January 7, 2023 in a 5-4 shootout loss to the Columbus Blue Jackets. Pacioretty played only five games with the team before sustaining a second Achilles tear on January 19 in a game against the Minnesota Wild.

Personal life

Pacioretty is the brother-in-law of former NHL player Maxim Afinogenov; Pacioretty married Afinogenov's sister, Katia, in July 2011. The couple have four sons and one daughter.

Pacioretty's paternal grandmother, Theresa Pacioretty (née Savoie) is a French-Canadian from Montreal. Pacioretty's mother is of Mexican origin. Having grown up in Mexico, she was not familiar with ice skating but given Pacioretty's very high energy as a child, took him to a rink to expend energy. The family of Pacioretty's paternal grandfather Burton hails from the Varese region of Lombardy, Italy, particularly the towns of Ferno, Gallarate, and Cardano al Campo.

In March 2016, McDonald's introduced the "Max 67" burger which was only available in its Quebec restaurants.

Career statistics

Regular season and playoffs

International

Awards and honors

References

External links

 

1988 births
Living people
American expatriate sportspeople in Switzerland
American men's ice hockey left wingers
American people of French-Canadian descent
American people of Italian descent
American sportspeople of Mexican descent
Bill Masterton Memorial Trophy winners
Carolina Hurricanes players
Hamilton Bulldogs (AHL) players
HC Ambrì-Piotta players
Ice hockey players from Connecticut
Ice hockey players at the 2014 Winter Olympics
Michigan Wolverines men's ice hockey players
Montreal Canadiens draft picks
Montreal Canadiens players
National Hockey League first-round draft picks
Olympic ice hockey players of the United States
People from New Canaan, Connecticut
Sioux City Musketeers players
Taft School alumni
Vegas Golden Knights players